Revaz Kvachakidze (born 12 February 1938) is a Georgian athlete. He competed in the men's long jump at the 1960 Summer Olympics, representing the Soviet Union.

References

1938 births
Living people
Athletes (track and field) at the 1960 Summer Olympics
Soviet male long jumpers
Male long jumpers from Georgia (country)
Olympic athletes of the Soviet Union
Place of birth missing (living people)